Werbkowice  is a village in Hrubieszów County, Lublin Voivodeship, in eastern Poland. It is the seat of the gmina (administrative district) called Gmina Werbkowice.

The village has a population of 3,098.

References

Werbkowice
Kholm Governorate
Lublin Voivodeship (1919–1939)